In 1998, Amy Ray and Emily Saliers of the Indigo Girls initiated the Suffragette Sessions Tour, a loose amalgamation of female artists that Ray described as "a socialist experiment in rock and roll--no hierarchy, no boundaries." 

The participants included Gail Ann Dorsey, Lisa Germano, Lourdes Pérez, Kate Schellenbach, Jane Siberry, Jean Smith, Josephine Wiggs and Thalia Zedek.

External links
 

Music festivals in the United States